Clifford Thurlow (born 1952, in London, England) trained as a journalist after failing to get a place at Cambridge and wrote his first book at the age of 23. He has been described by Penny Wark of The Times as "one of the UK's best ghostwriters."

Thurlow worked as the English editor of the Athens News under Yannis Horn during the last years of the Regime of the Colonels (1967–1974); he was 'asked' to leave the country when he reported on the anti-Junta speech given at the University by German author Günter Grass, who was held briefly under house arrest.

Rather than returning to the UK, Thurlow moved to India where he studied Buddhism in Dharamshala and worked with the Dalai Lama as one of a team translating Tibetan sacred texts into English. He traded gemstones in South East Asia and ran a travelling dolphin show in Spain before moving to Hollywood, where he penned Carol White's autobiography Carol Comes Home.

Thurlow is noted for creating memoirs in the style of a novel. Recent books are Fatwa: Living With A Death Threat (Hodder & Stoughton, 2005), which describes the flight of Jacky Trevane across the desert with two children to escape an abusive husband; Today I'm Alice (Sidgwick & Jackson, 2009) the story of Multiple Personality Disorder survivor Alice Jamieson, a Sunday Times Top Ten best-seller; and two books set in Iraq with former infantry captain turned mercenary James Ashcroft, Escape From Baghdad (Virgin, 2009), the rescue of Ashcroft's former Iraqi interpreter and his family from Shia Death Squads; and Making A Killing (Virgin, 2006) – on which Andy Martin wrote in The Daily Telegraph: "Ashcroft must have formed a good working alliance with ghostwriter Clifford Thurlow, because this diary of death and destruction radiates not just personality but that elusive, lyrical honesty the existentialists used to call authenticity."

Thurlow's Runaway (Simon & Schuster, 2013), Emily Mackenzie's story of life as a child prostitute in London's Soho in the early 1970s, spent five weeks in the Sunday Times Top Ten best-seller lists. Published in the wake of the Jimmy Savile child abuse scandal, Runaway was seen as having made an important contribution to the debate on the deficiencies of Britain's child care system.

In 2011, Thurlow became a director of www.yellowbay.co.uk, a publishing house dedicated to "edgy, daring and radical new writing". First digital/print-on-demand publications include Kindle best-selling trilogy The Killer 1,2 & 3, by Jack Elgos, Thurlow's novel Cocaine Confidence and David Pick's Mrs May: A PsychoSexual Odyssey

Books
2021 - Typhoon: The Inside Story of an RAF Fighter Squadron at War, Wing Commander Mike Sutton leads 1 (Fighter) Squadron on 300 deadly missions against ISIS.
2019 - Operation Jihadi Bride, John Carney's mission to rescue disillusioned jihadi brides from Islamic State.
2018 – Gigolo, true life story of how working-class Ben Foster becomes a gigolo to the super-rich
2013 – Making Short Films, The Complete Guide From Script to Screen, Bloomsbury Academic; 3rd edition
2013 – Runaway, Emily Mackenzie's life as a teenage prostitute
2013 – Cool, Sexy & Dead, anthology of short-stories
2012 – Cocaine Confidence, novel, the Balkan drug wars move to London 
2011 – The Second Rule, novel exploring love, loss and early success.
2009 – Escape From Baghdad, James Ashcroft rescues his Iraqi interpreter from death squads in Iraq
2009 – Today I'm Alice, the story of multiple personality disorder sufferer Alice Jamieson
2006 – Making A Killing, the story of Captain James Ashcroft
2004 – Fatwa: Living With A Death Threat, the story of Jacky Trevane
2003 – The Carol White Story
2000 – Sex, Surrealism, Dali and Me, the story of Carlos Lozano's life as an "Ambassador" for the surrealist painter Salvador Dalí. 
1992 – Brief Spring: A Journey Through Eastern Europe, co-written with Iris Gioia
1987 – Never Before Noon, the story of Afdera Fonda
1982 – Carol Comes Home, the story of British actress Carol White

External links
www.cliffordthurlow.com
www.making-short-films.com
www.telegraph.co.uk
www.makingakilling.co.uk
www.yellowbay.co.uk
Clifford Thurlow, ebooks-library.com

References

The Daily Telegraph https://www.telegraph.co.uk/culture/books/3656361/When-theyre-not-trying-to-kill-you-the-people-are-friendly.html

Making A Killing http://www.makingakilling.co.uk

Literary Agent http://www.andrewlownie.co.uk/authors/clifford-thurlow

Living people
1952 births
British biographers
Ghostwriters